Top 100 España is a record chart published weekly by PROMUSICAE (Productores de Música de España), a non-profit organization composed of Spanish and multinational record companies. This association tracks both physical (including CDs and vinyl) and digital (digital download and streaming) record consumption and sales in Spain.

Albums

References 

Spanish record charts
2023 in Spanish music
Spain albums